Anders Olof Gunnar Källén (13 February 1926 – 13 October 1968) was a leading Swedish theoretical physicist and a professor at Lund University until his death at the age of 42.

Biography
Källén earned his doctorate at Lund in 1950 and worked from 1952 to 1957 at CERN's theoretical division in Copenhagen, which then became the Niels Bohr Institute. He also worked at Nordita 1957–1958 and then began a professorship at Lund University.

Källén's research focused on quantum field theory and elementary particle physics. His developments included the so-called Källén–Lehmann representation of correlation functions in quantum field theory, and he made contributions to quantum electrodynamics, especially in renormalizing. He also worked with the axiomatic formulation of quantum field theory, which led to contributions to the theory of functions of several complex variables. He collaborated on the Pauli–Källén equation. The Källén function is named after him.

Källén worked for several years at the Bohr Institute. Källén was flying his own plane from Malmö to CERN in Geneva when it crashed in 1968. His two passengers, one of them his wife, survived the crash.

Many years after his death, Cecilia Jarlskog edited the book Portrait of Gunnar Källén: A Physics Shooting Star and Poet of Early Quantum Field Theory (Springer, 2013) with 9 invited contributors, all of whom had a personal acquaintance with Källen. The book consists mainly of testimonies by Källén's colleagues. Steven Weinberg, whose first published physics paper was motivated by Källén, wrote one of the book's chapters. The chapter deals with Källén's research and is the written version of a 2009 lecture by Weinberg.

Bibliography
G. Källén, Quantenelektrodynamik, Handbuch der Physik (Springer-Verlag, Berlin, 1958)
G. Källén, Elementary Particle Physics (Addison-Wesley, Reading, Massachusetts, 1964)
G. Källén, Quantum Electrodynamics (Springer-Verlag, Berlin, 1972); 2013 pbk reprint

See also
 Källén–Lehmann spectral representation

References

Further reading
 A. S. Wightman. Gunnar Källén 1926–1968, Comm. Math. Phys.  11 (1968) 181–182
 C. Jarlskog (ed.) "Portrait of Gunnar Källén : A physics shooting star and poet of early quantum field theory" (Springer Verlag, 2014)

1926 births
1968 deaths
Swedish physicists
Aviators killed in aviation accidents or incidents
Theoretical physicists
People associated with CERN
Victims of aviation accidents or incidents in 1968
Members of the Royal Swedish Academy of Sciences